The Malawi Medical Journal is a quarterly general medical journal and is open-access and peer reviewed. It is published by the University of Malawi College of Medicine and the Medical Association of Malawi. It was established in 1979 as the Medical Quarterly, obtaining its current name when it was relaunched in 1991. The editor-in-chief as of 2018 is Professor Adamson Muula (University of Malawi). According to the Journal Citation Reports, the journal has an impact factor of 1.123, ranking it 147th out of 172 journals in the category "Public, Environmental & Occupational Health", also as of 2017.

References

External links

General medical journals
Publications established in 1979
Open access journals
Quarterly journals
English-language journals